Bathygadus antrodes is a gadiform fish, a species of rattail. It is found at depths of up to 1200 m (3937 ft) in the waters around southern Japan and northern Taiwan.

This fish is known to grow to around 65 cm (25.5 in). It has a very wide, soft-boned head, a terminal mouth with very small teeth, small eyes and no barbel. The scales are small and deciduous.

References 

A new species, Caelorinchus sheni, and 19 new records of grenadiers (Pisces: Gadiformes: Macrouridae) from Taiwan - CHIOU Mei-Luen ; SHAO Kwang-Tsao ; IWAMOTO Tomio

Macrouridae
Taxa named by David Starr Jordan
Taxa named by Edwin Chapin Starks
Fish described in 1904
Fish of Japan
Fish of Taiwan